Arseny Arkadyevich Golenishchev-Kutuzov (1848–1913), was a Russian poet known in part for writing the texts of Modest Mussorgsky's two song cycles of the 1870s: Sunless and Songs and Dances of Death.

References

1848 births
1913 deaths
Russian male poets